Mosteiro Beneditino de San Bieito de Lérez is a monastery in Pontevedra, Galicia, Spain.

Monasteries in Galicia (Spain)
Bien de Interés Cultural landmarks in the Province of Pontevedra
Tourist attractions in Galicia (Spain)
Churches in Pontevedra